KRMT (channel 41) is a religious  television station in Denver, Colorado, United States, airing programming from the Daystar network. It is owned and operated by Daystar through its Community Television Educators subsidiary, and maintains offices on West 64th Avenue in Arvada, and its transmitter is located on Mount Lindo in rural southwestern Jefferson County.

History
The station first signed on the air on August 20, 1988, as KWBI-TV. Founded by Colorado Christian University, it originally operated as a religious independent station. In 1993, Colorado Christian University sold the station to Faith Bible Chapel International; the station changed its callsign to KRMT on January 10, 1994. Faith Bible Chapel sold KRMT to Daystar in 1997.

Technical information

Subchannel

Analog-to-digital conversion
KRMT shut down its analog signal, over UHF channel 41, on June 12, 2009, the official date in which full-power television stations in the United States transitioned from analog to digital broadcasts under federal mandate. The station's digital signal remained on its pre-transition UHF channel 40. Through the use of PSIP, digital television receivers display the station's virtual channel as its former UHF analog channel 41.

References

External links
www.daystar.com – Daystar official website

Daystar (TV network) affiliates
RMT
Television channels and stations established in 1988
1988 establishments in Colorado
Arvada, Colorado